Gartmore (Scottish Gaelic An Gart Mòr) is a village in the Stirling council area, Scotland. It is a village with a view of the Wallace Monument in Stirling, almost 25 miles away.
Formerly in Perthshire, it is one mile from the A81 Glasgow to Aberfoyle road, three miles south of Aberfoyle. The Rob Roy Way walking route passes nearby.

One of the villages more famous residents was Robert Bontine Cunninghame Graham  at Gartmore House.

External links

Lochlomond-Trossachs - Gartmore
Trossachs - Gartmore
BBC - Domesday Reloaded - Local History of Gartmore
YouTube narrated video on the Gartmore Obelisk Sundial

Villages in Stirling (council area)